Señorita Panamá 2003, the 21st Señorita Panamá beauty pageant  and 38th celebration of the Miss Panama contest, was held in the Figali Convention Center, Ciudad de Panamá, Panama, on Thursday November 26, 2003. After weeks of events, the winner was Jessica Rodríguez.

The pageant was broadcast live on RPC-TV. Eleven contestants competed for the title. At the end of the final night of competition, the outgoing titleholder Señorita Panamá 2002 Stefanie de Roux of Panama Centro crowned Jessica Rodríguez of Panama Centro as the new Señorita Panamá.

In the same night was celebrated the election of the "Señorita Panamá World",  was announced the winner of the Señorita Panamá Mundo title. Señorita Panamá World 2002 Yoselín Sánchez Espino of Los Santos crowned Melissa Del Carmen Piedrahita of Panama Centro as the new Señorita Panamá World.

Rodríguez competed in the 53rd edition of the Miss Universe pageant, held at the Centro de Convenciones CEMEXPO in Quito, Ecuador, on June 1, 2004. She won the award for best national costume. In other hands Piedrahita competed in Miss World 2004, the 54th edition of the Miss World pageant, was held on 4 December 2004 at the Crown of Beauty Theatre in Sanya, China.

Final result

Special awards

Judges
Luis Lucho Ortega 
Fanny De Cardoze
María Sofía Velázquez - Señorita Panamá 1993
Kathia Vargas
Rosario Rivera

Contestants 
The list of competitors was:

Election schedule
August 5 presentation to the press in the Hotel Continental
Wednesday November 25 election Best National Costume
Thursday November 26 Final night, coronation Señorita Panamá 2003

Candidates notes
Ana Karina Abrego won Miss Hawaiian Tropic Panamá 2006. She competed in the Treasure Island Hotel and Casino Theater Paradise, Nevada, on April 17, 2006.
Gabriela Moreno Gonzalez is a recognized TV host.
Anabella Hale Ruiz won Miss International Panamá 2004 and participated in Miss International 2004 in Beijing, China, on October 16, 2004. She was Unplaced.
Giselle Bissot Kieswetter won the Señorita Panamá 2006 and participated in the Miss World 2006 in the Palace of Culture and Science in Warsaw, Poland, on September 30, 2006. She was in the top 25 semi-finalists of beach beauty.
Lilianne Thompson Franceschi represented Panamá in the Miss Intercontinental 2005 pageant and place in the Top 12 winning also the Miss Photogenic  award.
Melissa Del Carmen Piedrahita represented  Panamá in the Miss Continente Americano 2006 where she was (Top 6) and the Reinado Internacional del Café 2004 being the 3rd Runner-up.
Fariba Hawkins was supposed competed in the Miss International 2001 but withdrew.

References

External links
 Últimas Noticias de Panamá y el Mundo | Telemetro Señorita Panamá  official website
MissPanama.net
Panama Crowns

Señorita Panamá
2003 beauty pageants